Sabina Brons (born 9 August 1965), known professionally as Selena, is a Dutch singer. She released the album Timebomb in 1989, and had three hit singles in her homeland with "Shotgun", "Timebomb" and "So Far Away".

References 

1965 births
Living people
Dutch women singers
Dutch pop singers
Disco singers
People from Heumen